Iván López (born April 12, 1984) is a National Record holding distance swimmer from Mexico. He has swum for Mexico at:
2006 Central American and Caribbean Games
2007 Pan American Games
2008 Open Water Worlds
2009 World Championships

At the 2006 Central American and Caribbean Games, he set the Mexican Record in winning the men's 800 free in 8:07.30. The time was also a Games Record.

References

1984 births
Male long-distance swimmers
Mexican male swimmers
Sportspeople from Guadalajara, Jalisco
Living people
Central American and Caribbean Games gold medalists for Mexico
Central American and Caribbean Games silver medalists for Mexico
Competitors at the 2006 Central American and Caribbean Games
Central American and Caribbean Games medalists in swimming
20th-century Mexican people
21st-century Mexican people